Madagascar competed at the 1980 Summer Olympics in Moscow, USSR.
The nation returned to the Olympic Games after boycotting the 1976 Summer Olympics.

Results by event

Athletics
Men's 800 metres
 Tisbite Rakotoarisoa 
 Heat — 1:50.5 (→ did not advance)

Men's 1,500 metres
Tisbite Rakotoarisoa
 Heat — 3:55.9 (→ did not advance)

Men's 10,000 metres
Jules Randrianari 
 Heat — 31:18.4 (→ did not advance)

Men's Marathon
 Jules Randrianari
 Final — 2:19:23 (→ 25th place)

Women's 800 metres
 Albertine Rahéliarisoa
 Heat — 2:11.7 (→ did not advance)

Women's 1,500 metres
 Albertine Rahéliarisoa
 Heat — 4:30.8 (→ did not advance)

Boxing
Men's Lightweight (60 kg)
 Sylvain Rajefiarison
 First Round — Lost to Jesper Garnell (Denmark) on points (0-5)

Swimming
Men's 100m Freestyle
 Zoe Andrianifaha
 Heats — 1:04.92 (→ did not advance)

Women's 100m Breaststroke
 Nicole Rajoharison
 Heats — 1:24.83 (→ did not advance)

Women's 100m Freestyle
 Bako Ratsifandrihamanana
 Heats — 1:07.27 (→ 25th - did not advance)

Women's 100m Butterfly
 Bako Ratsifandrihamanana
 Heats — 1:09.43 (→ 23rd - did not advance)

References
Official Olympic Reports

Nations at the 1980 Summer Olympics
1980
Olympics